Vincetoxicum bracteatum, synonyms including Tylophora pauciflora, is a species of climbing plant in the family Apocynaceae. It is commonly known as kiri aguna in Sri Lanka. It is edible and is used in traditional medicine. It was first described by Carl Peter Thunberg in 1821 as Cynanchum bracteatum.

Ecology
Vincetoxicum bracteatum is the food plant for the larva of Parantica aglea.

References

Further reading
 
Tylophora pauciflora in Flora of India

bracteatum
Flora of India
Flora of Sri Lanka
Plants described in 1821